13th FFCC Awards
December 18, 2008

Best Film: 
 Slumdog Millionaire 
The 13th Florida Film Critics Circle Awards were given on December 18, 2008.

Winners
Best Actor:
Mickey Rourke - The Wrestler
Best Actress:
Melissa Leo - Frozen River
Best Animated Film:
WALL-E
Best Cinematography:
The Dark Knight
Best Director:
Danny Boyle - Slumdog Millionaire
Best Documentary Film:
Man on Wire
Best Film:
Slumdog Millionaire
Best Foreign Language Film:
Let the Right One In (Låt den rätte komma in) • Sweden
Best Screenplay:
Slumdog Millionaire - Simon Beaufoy
Best Supporting Actor:
Heath Ledger - The Dark Knight (posthumous)
Best Supporting Actress:
Marisa Tomei - The Wrestler
Pauline Kael Breakout Award
Martin McDonagh - In Bruges

2000s
2008 film awards